The 16th Canadian Comedy Awards, presented by the Canadian Comedy Foundation for Excellence (CCFE), honoured the best live, television, film, and Internet comedy of 2014. The awards were presented in Toronto, Ontario, on 13 September 2015. Canadian Comedy Awards, also known as Beavers, were awarded in 29 categories.

The film Corner Gas: The Movie led with nine nominations, followed by web series Space Riders: Division Earth with seven and This Hour Has 22 Minutes with six.  Space Riders: Division Earth and This Hour Has 22 Minutes each won four Beavers.

Ceremony

After spending two years in Ottawa, Ontario, the Canadian Comedy Awards (CCA) returned to Toronto for the 16th awards.  The awards were presented at the Bram and Bluma Appel Salon of the Toronto Reference Library on 13 September 2015.

Winners and nominees

Nominees were announced on 30 June 2015 and public voting was open through July to 15 August. Winners are listed first and highlighted in boldface:

Multimedia

Live

Television

Internet

Special Awards

Multiple wins
The following people, shows, films, etc. received multiple awards

Multiple nominations
The following people, shows, films, etc. received multiple nominations

References

External links
Canadian Comedy Awards official website

Canadian Comedy Awards
Canadian Comedy Awards
Awards
Awards